In mathematics, Kronecker's lemma (see, e.g.) is a result about the relationship between convergence of infinite sums and convergence of sequences. The lemma is often used in the proofs of theorems concerning sums of independent random variables such as the strong Law of large numbers. The lemma is named after the German mathematician Leopold Kronecker.

The lemma 
If  is an infinite sequence of real numbers such that 
 
exists and is finite, then we have for all  and  that

Proof
Let  denote the partial sums of the x'''s. Using summation by parts,
 
Pick any ε > 0. Now choose N so that  is ε-close to s for k > N. This can be done as the sequence  converges to s. Then the right hand side is:
 
 
 
Now, let n go to infinity. The first term goes to s, which cancels with the third term. The second term goes to zero (as the sum is a fixed value).

References

 

Mathematical series
Lemmas